WESO (970 AM; "Emmanuel Radio") is a radio station broadcasting a Catholic radio format, simulcasting sister station WNEB in Worcester. Established in 1955, the station is licensed to serve Southbridge, Massachusetts, United States. WESO is owned by Emmanuel Communications, Inc.

WESO broadcast a country music format as "The Spirit 970" until October 2008, when the station began to simulcast the business talk programming of then-sister station WBNW in Concord. On June 13, 2014, Money Matters Radio, Inc. reached a deal to sell WESO to Emmanuel Communications, Inc., the owner of WNEB. The deal closed on August 29, 2014, at a purchase price of $250,000. Following the sale, WESO was converted to noncommercial operation and began to carry WNEB's "Emmanuel Radio" programming, which includes programming from EWTN Radio.

References

External links

Catholic radio stations
ESO
Radio stations established in 1955
Southbridge, Massachusetts
1955 establishments in Massachusetts
ESO
Catholic Church in Massachusetts